Grant Robinson (born August 15, 1998) is an American soccer player who currently plays for Monterey Bay FC in the USL Championship.

Career

Youth and college 
Robinson played four years of college soccer at George Mason University between 2016 and 2019, making 63 appearances, scoring 6 goals and tallying 4 assists.

While at college, Robinson also appeared in the NPSL for FC Baltimore in 2018, and in the USL PDL for The Villages SC in 2019.

Professional 
On March 4, 2020, it was announced Robinson had joined USL Championship side Las Vegas Lights ahead of their 2020 season. He made his debut on March 7, 2020, starting in a 1–1 draw with San Diego Loyal SC.

On March 11, 2021, Robinson joined USL Championship side Rio Grande Valley FC.

Robinson signed with Monterey Bay FC ahead of their inaugural USL Championship season on February 10, 2022. Robinson was included in the starting 11 for Monterey Bay's inaugural match, a 4-2 loss to Phoenix Rising FC.

References

External links 
 
 George Mason Patriots profile

1998 births
Living people
American soccer players
Association football midfielders
George Mason Patriots men's soccer players
Las Vegas Lights FC players
National Premier Soccer League players
Rio Grande Valley FC Toros players
Soccer players from Maryland
The Villages SC players
USL Championship players
USL League Two players
Monterey Bay FC players
People from Columbia, Maryland
Sportspeople from the Baltimore metropolitan area